Warren Jacmot (born March 19, 1987 in Lyon) is a French football defender. He represented France at Under-17 level. He currently plays for Lyon La-Duchère.

Career
Jacmot was a junior with Olympique Lyonnais from where he joined Scottish side Rangers in February 2004, as part of the Rangers Youth Development Company. He played in the 2004 SFA Youth Cup Final, Rangers losing to Kilmarnock, but was released at the end of the 2004-05 season.

He rejoined Lyon La-Duchère in 2008.

References

1987 births
Living people
French footballers
Olympique Lyonnais players
Rangers F.C. players
Amiens SC players
Lyon La Duchère players

Association football defenders